Palavas-les-Flots (Languedocien: Palavàs) is a commune in the Hérault department in the Occitanie region in southern France.

Geography
Palavas is a seaside resort, some six km south of Montpellier, at the Gulf of Lion and the Mediterranean. It lies on a strip of sand dunes that separates two lakes, the Étang de l'Arnel and the Étang du Méjean, from the sea. Its neighbouring communities are Lattes, Pérols, Mauguio and Villeneuve-lès-Maguelone.
The village center is located at the spot where the river Lez flows into the sea through a canalized section. Northwards, it stretches until Mauguio. Southwards, expansion is halted by a military area and an area used by the Ifremer.

Climate 

The city has a Mediterranean climate. The summer is warm and dry and the winter mild and humid.

History
The village originated as a settlement of fishermen who sold their catch on the markets of Montpellier. The Ancien Régime used the village as a coastal defence, building the Redoute de Ballestras.

From the beginning of the 19th century, local tourists and seasonal activities were drawn to the village. When in 1872 a local train to and from Montpellier started service, seaside tourism really took off. This train operated until 1968 and was painted by Albert Dubout.

Population

Economy
The mainstay of Palavas' economy is tourism. It is one of the most popular places in this part of France's coastline. In the film The Triplets of Belleville (Les Triplettes de Belleville), there is a song about the village. Apart from strolling, bathing and tanning there are also two museums: one dedicated to Albert Dubout and one dedicated to the local train to Montpellier.

The 45m high former local water tower can be seen from afar and features a revolving restaurant on top and a congress centre.

International relations
Palavas-les-Flots is twinned with:
 Sainte-Catherine-de-la-Jacques-Cartier, Quebec,
  Bayside, Victoria, Australia.

See also
Communes of the Hérault department
Phare de la méditerranée

References

External links

 Official web site

Communes of Hérault
Seaside resorts in France